Pure is the fourth album (but third released) by jazz saxophonist Chris Potter, recorded in 1994 and released in 1995 by the Concord Jazz label. Appearing on the album is Potter’s frequent collaborator, guitarist John Hart. Also appearing are organist/pianist Larry Goldings, bassist Larry Grenadier and veteran drummer Al Foster. According to praise from Neil Tesser in 1998, Goldings plays with "virtually none of the traditional organ-jazz fare" on this album.

Track listing
All compositions by Chris Potter except where noted.
 Salome's Dance - 6:37
 Checking Out - 3:58
 Resonance - 3:46
 Bad Guys - 6:40
 Boogie Stop Shuffle (Charles Mingus) - 3:22
 Second Thoughts - 5:47
 That's What I Said - 6:40
 The Fool on the Hill (John Lennon, Paul McCartney) - 4:25
 Bonnie Rose - 4:37
 You'd Be So Easy to Love (Cole Porter)  - 6:10
 The Distant Present - 4:45
 Ev'ry Time We Say Goodbye (Cole Porter) - 2:55

Personnel
 Chris Potter – bass clarinet, alto flute, alto saxophone, soprano saxophone, tenor saxophone
 Larry Goldings – organ, piano
 John Hart – guitar
 Larry Grenadier – upright bass
 Al Foster – drums

References

1994 albums
Chris Potter (jazz saxophonist) albums
Concord Records albums